Alipurduar Junction is a census town in the Alipurduar I CD block in the  Alipurduar subdivision of the Alipurduar district in the state of West Bengal, India.

Geography

Location

Area overview
Alipurduar district is covered by two maps. It is an extensive area in the eastern end of the Dooars in West Bengal. It is undulating country, largely forested, with numerous rivers flowing down from the outer ranges of the Himalayas in Bhutan. It is a predominantly rural area with 79.38% of the population living in the urban areas. The district has 1 municipal town and 20 census towns and that means that 20.62% of the population lives in rural areas. The scheduled castes and scheduled tribes, taken together, form more than half the population in all the six community development blocks in the district. There is a high concentration of tribal people (scheduled tribes) in the three northern blocks of the district.

Note: The map alongside presents some of the notable locations in the subdivision. All places marked in the map are linked in the larger full screen map.

Demographics
According to the 2011 Census of India, Alipurduar Railway Junction had a total population of 10,733 of which 5,370 (50%) were males and 5,363 (50%) were females. There were 902 persons in the age range of 0 to 6 years. The total number of literate people in Alipurduar Railway Junction was 8,755 (89.06% of the population over 6 years).

 India census, Alipurduar Jnc. had a population of 15,895. Males constitute 51% of the population and females 49%. Alipurduar Rly.Jnc. has an average literacy rate of 80%, higher than the national average of 59.5%; with 54% of the males and 46% of females literate. 8% of the population is under 6 years of age.

Infrastructure
According to the District Census Handbook 2011, Jalpaiguri, Alipurduar Railway Junction covered an area of 7.2 km2. Among the civic amenities, it had 18 km roads, with both closed and open drains, the protected water supply involved service reservoir, tank, pond, lake, tubewell, borewell. It had 2,000 domestic electric connections, 500 road lighting points. Among the medical facilities it had 1 hospital, 22 medicine shops. Among the educational facilities it had  4 primary schools, 1 middle school, 1 secondary school, the nearest general degree college at Alipurduar 2.5 km away. It had 1 special school for the disabled. Among the social, recreational, cultural facilities it had 2 stadiums, 1 auditorium/ community hall, 1 public library, 1 reading room. It has the branch office of 1 nationalised bank.

References

Cities and towns in Alipurduar district